Fate/strange Fake is a Japanese light novel series in Type-Moon's Fate franchise, written by Ryōgo Narita and illustrated by Morii Shizuki.

It was originally placed on Narita's homepage under the title of "Fake/states night" on April 1, 2008, presented as a prologue and introduction for a role playing style game as an April Fool's prank. The text was taken down after April Fool's, but was later rereleased in the form of a novel included as an extra with the magazine TYPE-MOON Ace 2 in 2009, with illustrations by Morii Shizuki and an afterword by the author.

In 2014, it was announced that both a novel and manga series would be published, and a brief trailer was made. An anime television film adaptation by A-1 Pictures titled Fate/strange Fake: Whispers of Dawn is set to premiere in Q3 2023.

Plot

Story 
The story centers around a Grail War faultily copied from the Third Holy Grail War in Fuyuki. After the end of the third Grail War, an organization from the United States that has magi separate from the London-based Mage Association as members took data from Fuyuki's Grail War and planned their own ritual. After seventy years, they used the city Snowfield as the Sacred Land for their own Grail War. They were unable to successfully copy every aspect of the ritual, which led to it acting only as an imitation that has lost the Saber class and allowed for the summoning of strange Servants due to the definition of a "hero" being blurred.

The Mage's Association has sent Rohngall and his pupil, Faldeus, to investigate the city and the status of the war. Faldeus, a spy from the US organization, has Rohngall sniped upon arrival, despite knowing that Rohngall was simply a puppet. He announces that their Holy Grail War has been in development and that it is real, which causes an uproar at the Clock Tower, and wishes to "advertise" the project to the Association.

Characters

Main characters 
 
 
 Ayaka is the seventh Master and the Master of Saber of the False Holy Grail War of Fate/strange Fake. It is revealed that Ayaka is Person A (A氏, A-shi); a resident of Fuyuki City who disappeared in the past after a family suicide. Ayaka was a student who moved to Fuyuki's Shinto in the beginning of spring shortly after turning twenty. She rented room two on the eleventh floor of Semina Apartments. There was a family suicide during the fall, and she went missing a month later. Although the police were asked to start an investigation, it turned up nothing, Kaede Makidera claiming that Person A only went on a journey of self-discovery and that she will come back when she becomes stronger. The story later become told as a ghost story by Ayako Mihatsuzuri with an unknown amount of embellishment. The "Little Red Riding Hood of Semina Apartments" is a common ghost story known by students in Homurahara Academy, to which Taiga Fujimura has banned them.
 
 
 Ayaka's Servant. Due to the nature of the False War, there is no Saber class Servant, but he is summoned as a Servant of the True War by Cashura, an agent of the government, but Saber's contract is linked to Ayaka due to her special Command Seals. He is summoned on the first day of the False Holy Grail War of Fate/strange Fake using the box that held Excalibur's scabbard, Avalon, which was found by the Einzberns in Cornwall, thinking it would be enough to summon King Arthur. However, since Avalon was placed in the box by Richard I in life, he is the one who was summoned. 
 Saber's True Name is Richard I (リチャード一世, Richādo Issei?), the Lionheart. His bravery earned him the name "Lionheart" and even the enemy general praised him as the "greatest knight".  In the past, he, Saladin and the leading Hassan-i-Sabbah at the time fought together against a Dead Apostle during the Third Crusade. He is known as the "Wandering King", not because he was always headed off to a battlefield or on his way back from one, but because he was the king who wandered over the border between history and myth, the last king with one foot in an age when faeries and runes were still out in the open.
 
 
 Tiné is the Master of Archer in the False Holy Grail War of Fate/strange Fake. Tiné's people are an indigenous people who had apparently kept watch over the Snowfield region for a thousand years before, in the early twentieth century, they were driven out by the government and the group of magus looking to prepare the land for the False Holy Grail War. Tiné participates in the War seemingly with the intent to return her people to their rightful place. She does not have a particular wish for the Holy Grail to grant.
 
 
 Tsubaki is the Master of Rider in the False Holy Grail War of Fate/strange Fake. She was born to Eastern-Asian magi parents in their thirties seeking for ways to further their future in the world of magecraft. They were among those who managed to take the actual machinery underlying the Fuyuki Holy Grail War system, and while there, also obtained partial knowledge on Zouken Matou's magecraft. Seeking to adapt it to their own use, they eventually reached the idea of using magically-modified bacteria to better their host, and decided to use their first born daughter as the test subject. Speaking words like "We will make you into an illustrious mage", her parents' experiments caused her great pain. They felt no love for her as a person, but only as a vessel to continue their family line. Although their experiments proved to be fruitful, they lost control of some of the bacteria before she was complete. This deprived her of her consciousness, but her parents had long lost any interest in her as a person. She was hospitalized solely for the sake of making sure that an heir could be born from her. While in a coma, Tsubaki entered her dream world, where she initially suffered from great loneliness. After eventually getting used to it, she continued to explore the city, and she eventually stopped keeping track of time after three months. After one year, the False Holy Grail War began to approach.  It was noted, by Orlando Reeve, that Tsubaki's parents had planned to ally with the police chief, thus implying that they worked for the government organization of America.
 
 
 Orlando Reeve is the Master of Caster in the False Holy Grail War of Fate/strange Fake. He is the police chief of Snowfield. He is a magus who has gone to great lengths to prepare for the Holy Grail War. He has known of the ritual, and he is disappointed in the government for their decision to advertise it to outsiders.
 
 
 Jester is the Master of Assassin in the False Holy Grail War of Fate/strange Fake. He is a Dead Apostle known as the Six Hearted Revolver (六連男装, Rokuren Dansō) who has taken interest in the Holy Grail to grant his wish. As it is his first time participating in such a battle, he researched the nature of the ritual thoroughly, and plans to summon a Servant of the Assassin class. He brought ten disciples with him to Snowfield, all of whom are loyal to the point where they will face certain death to avenge their supposedly dead master. They don't appear to know of his true nature because they are shocked at his supposed demise. His original form is that of a small girl.
 
 
 Flat is the Master of Berserker in the False Holy Grail War of Fate/strange Fake. He was born into the Escardos family, a line of magi living on the coast of the Mediterranean Sea, as the eldest son. It was originally hoped that he would be a magus of rare quality in terms of Magic Circuits and the talent to control them. During his childhood, Flat sneaked onto Van-Fem's casino boat as a minor, but Van-Fem let him stay in return for Flat showing him his magecraft. He was thought to be a true prodigy as he was growing up, but his true nature was shown after studying under a number of professors at the Clock Tower. They began to complain about him, and he was assigned to the only professor left, Lord El-Melloi II. Though he quickly developed his magical talents over the next few years and surpassed all of his peers, the problems with his personality caused him to be unable to graduate and become one of El-Melloi's eldest students at close to the age of twenty. While his teacher does not like to let unprepared magi into the world, he came to regret keeping Flat around.
 
 The Wolf is the Master of Lancer in the False Holy Grail War of Fate/strange Fake. He is a silver wolf familiar of the magus originally planning to participate in the Holy Grail War. He was created with the purpose of being used as a catalyst to summon a Servant. The magus believes that he needs to summon a being more ancient than the Origin of Heroes, something that transcends Heroes who were "kings". He wishes to summon an existence Egyptians called "God", but his plan is ruined when the Wolf obtains Command Spells instead of him.
 
 Sigma is the Master of Watcher in the True Holy Grail War of Fate/strange Fake. He is the product of the rape of Maiya Hisau by an unknown soldier. He wasn't given a name and was taken away from Maiya when he was a baby. He was raised along others as a child soldier that uses magecraft for an unknown government, and after the government's downfall he became a mercenary, and was hired by Francesca as a wild card. After summoning Watcher, she gives him "unreasonable trials" so he can become True Lancer while living. To hide Watcher's identity, he claims to have summoned Lancer Charlie Chaplin.
 
 
 Faldeus is the Master of True Assassin in the True Holy Grail War of Fate/strange Fake. He is a magus belonging to the government organization responsible for starting the False Holy Grail War, and despite seeming to be barely past his mid-twenties, displays knowledge of the events seventy years prior as if having had experienced them personally. He is part of a "certain American organization" that answers to the American government. Rather than being an organization of magi, it instead only has some magi as members. He went undercover within the Mage's Association with the eventual purpose of spreading news of the ritual and a warning to the Association's magi. He also learned much about the organization under the tutelage of Rohngall while only revealing his name to the magus. He earned enough of a reputation to be recognized on sight by the Wolf's creator.
 
 Bazdilot is the Master of True Archer in the True Holy Grail War of Fate/strange Fake. He a ruthless murderer in service of the Scladio crime family. He summons the mighty Greek hero Heracles as his servant. Disgusted by his servant's refusal to murder children, he uses all three of his command seals combined with the cursed mud of the Grail to forcibly alter Heracles into a pseudo-Avenger servant. He is based in a meat-packaging plant, and uses a system of magecraft based on human sacrifices, having already murdered over twenty-four thousand people in preparation with hundreds more ready to be killed.
 
 
 Francesca is the Master of True Caster during the True Holy Grail War, her true identity is François Prelati from the lifetimes of Joan of Arc and Gilles de Rais, being the latter's mentor in the occult. While originally male with his first death establishing him as a Heroic Spirit separate from his original self, Francois survived by possessing numerous bodies over the years regardless of gender. Of Francesca's numerous deaths, there are seven where she was left speechless or otherwise overwhelmed, including Kischur Zelretch Schweinorg, Saint Germain, the "consoling witch that is eternally alive", Van-Fem, Satsuki Kurogiri, her teachers in magecraft, and Touko Aozaki.
 She seems to be allied to the American organization behind the False Holy Grail War, but even so, Orlando Reeve refers to her as an outsider. In turn she calls him new, implying that while she is considered separate from the group, she's been affiliated with them longer than Reeve himself. She claims to hate Dead Apostles and is on the side of humanity, but Orlando replies she's just fighting with them over food.
 
 Haruri is the Master of True Berserker during the True Holy Grail War. She is the granddaughter of Odd Borzak, a magus killed by Kiritsugu Emiya during Fate/Zero, which then left his surviving family to be viciously attacked and ransacked for his research, leaving only Haruri, his granddaughter, as the only survivor. She wishes to use the Grail to render all methods of concealment used by Magi ineffective, compromising their society's secrecy.
 She loses control of her Servant shortly after summoning it, but after she is saved by Ishtar, who can control Berserker, she decides to join Ishtar.
  - 
 
 The overly arrogant King of Heroes who once ruled Uruk with his friend Enkidu, appearing during the Fourth and Fifth Holy Grail Wars of Fuyuki. He was brought into the False Holy Grail War as a Servant of Tiné Chelc, who killed his original Master, a magus whose ancestor acquired the discarded key to Gilgamesh's treasure vault that he used for the summoning ritual instead of the first skin shed by a snake.
  - 
 
 Gilgamesh's only friend who was summoned as Lancer-class Servant by the Wolf during the False Holy Grail. Shaped from clay by their parents Anu and Aruru, lacking any gender, Enkidu was placed in the wilderness where they met and befriended Gilgamesh before they died as a result of Isthar's machinations.
 
 The Servant summoned by Tsubaki Kuruoka in the False Holy Grail War of Fate/strange Fake. Rider the embodiment of pestilence given form by the False Grail, and "he" is given the True Name Pale Rider (ペイルライダー, Peiru Raidā). Differing from those called Heroic Spirits, "he" is only one in name. Far from a "hero", "he" cannot even be called a Villainous Spirit or Demonic Spirit. Some regions have called "him" a "curse", and some religions have denoted "him" to be "divine punishment." "He" is "disease", that which has existed since time immemorial and that which will continue to exist far into the future. "He" has lived a shorter life than anyone, and yet has lived a longer life than anyone. Called a horseman who has brought calamity to all, "he" is that which "let loose" the Black Death that killed thirty million people and came "under the name" of Spanish Influenza that killed fifty million people. Given a physical presence despite not being a Heroic Spirit, "he" continues to exist in that moment to take the lives of those on the planet to provide "himself" nourishment for life to begin anew.
  - 
 
 The Servant summoned by Orlando Reeve in the False Holy Grail War of Fate/strange Fake. In life, he met Hans Christian Andersen while living in Paris around the time of 1843. He is also the author of The Count of Monte Cristo, which features the fictional character Edmond Dantès.
 
 
 The Servant summoned by Jester Karture in the False Holy Grail War of Fate/strange Fake. Assassin's True Name has been forsaken as of before the time she gained the properties of a Heroic Spirit, but she is given the monikers of No Name Assassin and Beautiful Assassin (美しき暗殺者,Utsukushiki Asashin?). She was a former candidate for the position of Hassan-i Sabbah, the pseudonym shared by the leaders of the League of Assassins, the Hashshashin.
  - 
 
 Flat Escardos's Servant who summoned during the False Holy Grail War of Fate/strange Fake, the medium used to summon being a replica of knife from the Night Wars of the British Empire video game. Having no true form or soul due being the embodiment of mystery behind another bestowed the moniker of Jack the Ripper, the Berserker servant is a shapeshifter who can disguise himself as a watch Flat keeps on his person and assumed the forms of those speculated to have been the killer as an "emblem of madness." His Noble Phantasms are From Hell, turning into a demonic representation of Jack the Ripper, and Natural Born Killers where he conjures multiple bodies depending on his Master's quantity of Mana.
 
 The Servant of Bazdilot Cordelion in the True Holy Grail War of Fate/strange Fake. He has also been granted attributes of an Avenger-class Servant through the machinations of his Master. His True Name is Alcides (アルケイデス, Arukeidesu), the human side of Heracles whose divinity has been lost through interference from his Master's Command Spells awakening past memories from his life and mud from the Fuyuki Grail.
 
 The Servant of Verner Caesarmund and the rest of the El-Melloi Classroom in the True Holy Grail War of Fate/strange Fake. Her True Name is Hippolyta (ヒッポリュテー, Hipporyutē?).
 
 The Servant of Faldeus Dioland in the True Holy Grail War of Fate/strange Fake. His True Name is Hassan-i-Sabbah, with the moniker of "Hassan of the Ghostly Weft". He came to hold the title of "Old Man of the Mountain" by becoming the "shadow of death" rather than become one of the nineteen leaders of the Hashshashin.
 
 The Servant of Francesca Prelati in the True Holy Grail War of Fate/strange Fake. Caster's True Name is François Prelati (フランソワ・プレラーティ,Furansowa Purerāti?), a cleric in France during the time of Joan of Arc. He was a close friend of Gilles de Rais, helping him with financial difficulties through alchemy. François was also involved with black magic, and Gilles became involved in his rituals as he forgot his original goals. François was the actual magus leading these ceremonies to summon demons, while Gilles was merely a patron involved in the rituals. He owned what became the Noble Phantasm Prelati's Spellbook that is summoned with Gilles under the Caster-class, despite Gilles not actually being a magus. François had translated it from Chinese manuscripts into Italian, and those manuscripts had been previously translated from a non-human language. He was eventually executed and became sublimated as a Heroic Spirit. Despite this, there is a still living François Prelati currently going by the name of Francesca. The Heroic Spirit François possesses no memories from after his initial death.
 
 The Servant of Haruri in the True Holy Grail War of Fate/strange Fake. Her True Name is Huwawa, the beast of the Cedar Forest in Mesopotamian mythology. The Mesopotamian gods forced together the souls of 2,891 human children and gave them life as a complete being. One little girl was the only one among the thousands to retain her sanity, and so Enkidu refers to Huwawa as female. She has been shown to fly into a rage immediately upon summoning, striking down her Master before a contract could be made. She is also shown to be terrified of Ishtar, who intervenes on Haruri's behalf and forces the contract between the two of them.
 
 The Watcher-class Servant summoned by Sigma in the True Holy Grail War of Fate/strange Fake. Watcher's True Name is unknown, censored as ○○○·○○○○. Although described as a Heroic Spirit, she is said to be an abnormal phenomenon that would be hard to call a hero, god, or demon. Upon her summoning, Enkidu senses an "abnormality" with his Presence Detection skill and wonders if he has "angered them a little," but does not believe it has anything to do with a Heroic Spirit being summoned. The purpose of Watcher is not to act as Servant replacing one of the other classes. She is a "lookout" observing the Holy Grail War, and said to be an obstacle for Sigma to overcome so he can become "Lancer while living." She will give him "unreasonable" trials to overcome so that he can "become somebody."
 
 The goddess of Mesopotamian mythology. After she was insulted by Gilgamesh and assaulted by Enkidu throwing Gugalanna's entrails at her in Uruk, she decided to leave a vestige of herself to manifest, "If one day, 'those two' were to meet again on this planet." Due to the fact that gods could not manifest in the modern world, she possessed the Einzbern homunculus Fillia, using her as a "sacrificial shrine maiden" and overwriting her. Alcides initially tries to kill her due to his hatred of the gods, but later ignores her as she is not a true goddess or even an avatar of one, just a "goddess's curse". To ascend to true godhood, Ishtar creates a temple for herself and appoints Haruri as her priestess.

Secondary characters 
 Clan Calatin
 Clan Calatin is the codename of a group of magi police officers serving under Orlando, granted various Noble Phantasms created by Caster.
 John Wingard is one of the officers, and after having his right hand cut by Jester Karture, Alexandre Dumas gives him an artificial hand that has a built-in dagger coated in Hydra venom. During the battle with Alcides, Dumas decides to make John into a hero, and uses his second Noble Phantasm, Musketeers' Masquerade, to greatly empower John, allowing him to fight on par with Alcides.
 
 A priest and a member of the church.
 Twenty years before the False Holy Grail War, Hansa was from a small village in the mountainous region of Spain, but his hometown was destroyed by a Dead Apostle. It left the orphan boy surviving in the wilderness of the mountains. Hansa was eventually saved by Dilo and was later adopted by Dilo's acquaintance Delmio Cervantes. Delmio trained him with martial arts and Hansa decided to pursue the path of an Executor. He is a member of the Assembly of the Eighth Sacrament. He was sent to Snowfield by the Holy Church as a moderator for the False Holy Grail War.
 
 
 Lord El-Melloi II is highly regarded in the Clock Tower and he is the professor of Flat. He once participated in the Fourth Holy Grail War. He was formerly known as Waver Velvet (ウェイバー・ベルベット, Weibā Berubetto).
 
 
 Rohngall was sent by the Mage's Association to investigate the Snowfield's Grail War. At some point in the past, Rohngall took Faldeus Dioland as his student, unaware that the younger man was a spy for the American organisation.
 
 She is an Einzbern homunculus involved in the False Holy Grail War of Fate/strange Fake. For unknown reasons, she gave Ayaka her five special Command Seals and told her to go to Snowfield. As of the summoning of True Berserker, her body has been possessed by the goddess Ishtar.
 El-Melloi Classroom
 The students of Lord El-Melloi II and classmates of Flat. Many of the students of the El-Melloi Classroom travel to Snowfield after the death of Flat Escardos and the emergence of Thia Escardos. It is revealed they are collectively the Masters of Hippolyta in the True and False Holy Grail Wars, with the exception of Yvette, who was excluded as a liability that would betray them whenever she found it funny and thus was not granted a Command Spell by Verner. While one of the Command Spells is shared among the entire class, Verner holds the other two completely. They consist of Verner Caesarmund, Svin Glascheit, Yvette L. Lehrman, Caules Forvedge, Nazica Pentel, Radia Pentel, Roland Berzinsky, Rin Tohsaka, Luviagelita Edelfelt, Fezgram vor Sembren, Org Rum, and Mary Lil Fargo. As Verner is making the Command Spell invade the Magic Circuits of other people, the feedback he would receive from a betrayal would kill him.

Thia Escardos is a being created as the culmination of the 1800-year-old plan devised by Mesala Escardos of the Escardos family. The goal was to make Earth's next prime species, that would stay behind and take over when either Human Order was over or humanity abandoned the planet. Since childhood, Flat has been able to see his "other self", a gift only he possesses. His own family at first believed he was having delusions, then assumed he had some unknown Mystic Eyes, but both theories turned out to be false. Flat's ability to see Thia allowed him to survive his family's multiple assassination attempts on him. Thia takes over Flat's body after he is killed by Faldeus.

Minor characters 
 
 Also known as Dead Apostle of the Millennium Lock (千年錠の死徒,Sennenjō no Shito?) and the Comedian of the Dead Apostles. He is the twenty-seventh of The Twenty-seven Dead Apostle Ancestors.
 Alcatraz is a magus who became a vampire through his magical research. He is an old friend of Kischur Zelretch Schweinorg, and he was one of the people present for Arcueid Brunestud's birth eight-hundred years ago. He only met her that one time, but he left a lasting impression on her. He has been missing for over a century, and it is unknown to others if he is still alive.
 
 He is a magus who works for the US government. He tried to summon King Arthur for the False Holy Grail War, but was killed by Assassin, leaving the summoning incomplete. Richard I was summoned instead.
 
 He is one of five living Magicians capable of True Magic beyond modern science or Magecraft. He has numerous nicknames, including Zelretch the Wizard Marshall (魔道元帥ゼルレッチ, Madō Gensui Zerurecchi?), Zelretch of the Jewels (宝石のゼルレッチ, Hōseki no Zerurecchi?), Old Man of the Jewels (宝石翁, Hōseki Okina?), and Kaleidoscope (万華鏡（カレイドスコープ）, Mangekyō (Kareidosukōpu)?)." He has control over the Second Magic, "Kaleidoscope", which allows for the "Operation of Parallel Worlds."
 Mr. and Mrs. Kuruoka
 The parents of Tsubaki Kuruoka. Originally intended to summon Qin Shi Huang as a Servant before being infected by Pale Rider.
 Master of Archer
 The original Master of Archer in the False Holy Grail War of Fate/strange Fake before Tiné Chelc kills him to take over the contract.
 Synthetic beast creator
 The creator of The Synthetic beast Silver Wolf.
 
 Magus contracted with Francesca Prelati to be the Master of True Rider. However, they were unable to contact her after she illegally crossed the border of the United States. She forfeited her right as Rider's Master and her Command Seals after losing a duel to Rin Tohsaka.
 
The fourteenth of the Twenty-seven Dead Apostle Ancestors. He even goes as far as worrying about global affairs, and is fond of "trivial things". Most recent rumors about him said that he had recently constructed buildings in the celebrity town Monaco and started running a weekly casino boat, Fem's Casa, where he challenged other visitors on a weekly basis.
During one confrontation with Jester, Flat called Van-Fem on Hansa's cellphone, and upon learning of Jester's intention of denying human history after obsessing over his Servant, Van-Fem completely severs ties with him and reveals his true name, and asks Hansa to dispose of him.

Production information 
As of February 2023, the series was released only in Japanese; no English release has been announced.

Light novel 
Published by Dengeki Bunko (Kadokawa/ASCII Media Works).

Manga 
Published by Type-Moon Books. Sales by Media Pal.

Anime 
An official animated promotional video was released on December 31, 2019, it was animated by A-1 Pictures and uses the song "Belong" by Hiroyuki Sawano.

An anime television film adaptation was announced during the Aniplex Online Fest 2022 event on September 24, 2022. Titled Fate/strange Fake: Whispers of Dawn, it is produced by A-1 Pictures and directed by Shun Enokido and Takahito Sakazume, with scripts written by Daisuke Ōhigashi, character designs by Yūkei Yamada, and music composed by Hiroyuki Sawano. It was originally set to air on December 31, 2022, during the annual Fate Project New Year's Eve TV Special, but was later delayed due to production issues. The film is set to premiere in Q3 2023. The theme song is "FAKEit" by SawanoHiroyuki[nZk]:Laco. Aniplex of America has licensed the special.

References

External links 
 Fake/states night website 
 Dengeko Bunko official website for Fate/strange Fake 
 Anime official website 
 Type-Moon official website 

2023 anime films
2015 Japanese novels
A-1 Pictures
Anime and manga based on light novels
Aniplex
Dengeki Bunko
Fate/stay night manga
Fate/stay night novels
Light novels
Seinen manga